77th Street may refer to:
77th Street (Manhattan), a road
77th Street (IRT Lexington Avenue Line), a station in Manhattan
77th Street (BMT Fourth Avenue Line), a station in Brooklyn
77th Street (clothing), a Singapore clothing company founded in 1988